蒲生 may refer to:
 Pu Sheng, the original name of Fu Sheng (苻生) (335-357), an emperor of the Chinese/Di state Former Qin
 Gamo (disambiguation), in Japanese